is a joint lock in judo that targets an opponent's leg.  It is one of the official 29 grappling techniques of Kodokan Judo.  It is one of the nine joint techniques of the Kansetsu-waza list, one of the three grappling lists in Judo's Katame-waza enumerating 29 grappling techniques. Ashi garami is one of the four forbidden techniques, Kinshi-waza.

See also
The Canon Of Judo
Joint lock
Leglocks

References

External links
 Entangled leglock
 Photo from Jigorokano.it
 Ashi Garami, and other leglocks demonstrated

Judo technique
Grappling positions